{
  "type": "FeatureCollection",
  "features": [
    {
      "type": "Feature",
      "properties": {},
      "geometry": {
        "type": "Point",
        "coordinates": [
          34.439735,
          31.513428
        ]
      }
    }
  ]
}The Islamic University of Gaza, also known as IUG and IU Gaza, is an independent Palestinian university established in 1978 in Gaza City. It was the first higher education institution to be established in Gaza Strip. The university has eleven faculties capable of awarding BA, BSc, MA, MSc, MD, PhD, diplomas and higher diplomas, in addition to twenty research centers and institutes and the affiliated Turkish-Palestinian Friendship Hospital.

The Islamic University of Gaza is a member of twelve regional and international associations and networks of higher education, including the International Association of Universities (IAU), Mediterranean Universities Union (UNIMED), Association of Arab Universities (AAU), Federation of the Universities of the Islamic World (FUIW), Black Sea and Eastern Mediterranean Academic Network (BSEMAN), and the Global University Network for Innovation-GUNi.

A large part of the Islamic University of Gaza was damaged by air strikes during the 2008-2009 Gaza war and the 2014 Israel–Gaza conflict.

History 
No universities or higher education institutions existed in the occupied West Bank and Gaza Strip until 1972. Before then, Palestinian high school graduates sought higher education abroad, mostly in Egyptian and Jordanian universities. However, the restrictions on student movements after the Israeli occupation of West Bank and Gaza Strip in 1967, the declining economic conditions, and the increasing limitations on the admission of Palestinian students to Arab universities changed this situation. As such, local initiatives led by local elders and social and nationalist leaders sought to establish national higher education institutions in the occupied territories, often building on already existing schools and colleges.

Sheikh Mohammad Awwad, then head of the Gaza Chapter of the Azhari Institute, led the Islamic University’s founding committee. On 12 April 1978, the committee issued a decree to establish the University, which was composed of three faculties: Sharia, Usool-Deen, and Arabic Language (which later evolved into the Faculty of Arts). The University was later inaugurated in November 1978 as an independent, nonprofit University, which was also the first higher education institution in the Gaza Strip. The Faculty of Education was founded in 1980, while the Faculties of Commerce and Arts were founded the following year. The Faculties of Nursing and Engineering were founded in 1993. In 2005, the Faculty of Information Technology was founded, followed by the Faculty of Medicine in 2006.

The Islamic University was subjected to the different Israeli restrictions against Palestinian universities, which the Palestinians perceived as centres of political struggle and nation-building. The establishment of the Faculty of Nursing, intended in 1986, was denied by Israeli authorities until 1993. Building permits were stalled and limited. Also, similar to other universities, the Islamic University was subjected to severe restrictions on academic freedom such as limitations of staff movement and Military Order 854. It was also issued with a temporary license that required annual renewal, and denied tax exemptions.

Campus 

The Islamic University of Gaza is considered a large university (uniRank enrollment range: 15,000-19,999 students). The main campus is located in Gaza City, with branch campuses in Khan Yunis in the southern Gaza Strip and Al Zahra in the middle of Gaza Strip. The total area of the three campuses is 325817 square meters. The Al Zahra campus is home to the Faculty of Medicine and the Turkish-Palestinian Friendship Hospital.

Academics
The Islamic University of Gaza is home to eleven faculties:

Faculty of Arts  
The faculty was established in 1978 as the Arabic Language Department, which later expanded into the Faculty of Arts. It comprises over 40 academics and professors in six departments: Arabic Language, English language, Geography, Journalism and Media, Social Services, and History & Archaeology. Through these departments, the faculty awards Bachelor degrees in 13 different majors including Arabic language and literature, English language/literature, English/translation, History & Archaeology, Journalism, Public relations, and social services. It awards a Master of Arts degrees in six majors, including Arabic language, English language/linguistics and translation, Journalism, History, Geography, and Social Services. The faculty also awards PhD degree in Arabic Language.

Faculty of Education  
Established in 1980, the faculty grants Bachelor degrees in 15 majors different majors, including primary education (elementary level), psychology, Counselling and education guidance, science education, Islamic studies education, Arabic language education, English language education, geography education, social studies education, history education, chemistry education, mathematics education, physics education, and biology education. 

The faculty awards a Master of Arts degrees in four majors: Curricula and Methodology, Fundamentals of Education, Rehabilitation Sciences, and Early Childhood Education. The curricula and methodology has the following concentrations: mathematics, Arabic language, sciences, English, and instructional technology. The fundamentals of education has the following concentrations: Islamic education and educational administration. The faculty also awards PhD degrees in four majors: Curricula and Methodology, Guidance and Counselling, Community Psychology, and Educational Administration.

Faculty of Shariah and Law  
Founded in 1978, the faculty consists of the Islamic Shariah and Shariah & Law departments (the later was founded in 2005). It awards Bachelor's degrees in Sharia and Sharia & Law, with the latter focusing on legal aspects and the Intersection of Islam and Palestinian laws. The faculty awards Masters of Arts degrees in four majors: Foundations of Jurisprudence, Comparative Jurisprudence, Islamic jurisdiction, and Law.

Faculty of Usul al-Deen  
The Faculty of Usul al-Deen (Fundamentals of Belief) was founded in 1978 as one of the three faculties at the year of IUG establishment. It consists of four departments: Quran and Tafsir (interpretation), Hadith Sharif, Aqidah, and Dawat. The faculty awards Bachelor degrees in Usul al-Deen and Dawat. It awards Master of Arts degrees in the majors of Hadith, Aqidah, and Quran & Tafsir. It also awards PhD degrees in the majors of Quran and Tafsir (interpretation), Hadith Sharif, Aqidah.

Faculty of Engineering 
The Faculty of Engineering was established in the academic year 1992/1993. It includes 25 Professors, 19 Associate Professors, and 15 Assistant Professors, in addition to other junior academic staff and administrative staff. The faculty consists of eight departments in Civil engineering, Architectural engineering, Electrical Engineering, Industrial Engineering, Mechanical Engineering, Electrical engineering, Environmental engineering, Computer engineering, and Systems engineering. 

The faculty grants bachelor degrees in ten majors. It also awards MSc degrees in 14 different majors, including civil engineering/infrastructure, civil engineering/construction management, civil engineering/structure design and rehabilitation of structures, electrical engineering/control systems, water resources engineering, telecommunications, and others. The faculty offers a single PhD program in computer engineering. 

In 2009, the faculty inaugurated the Ewan (Iwan) Cultural Heritage Centre which is focused on the restoration and maintenance of ancient buildings in the Gaza Strip and preservation of Palestinian cultural identity. In 2020, the faculty established the Center of Excellence for Renewable Energy (CERE) to promote research and development in clean energy technology.

Faculty of Nursing  
The Faculty of Nursing was established in 1986 but due to Israeli restrictions it operated for seven years as a subdepartment of the Faculty of Science until its formal launch as a separate faculty in 1993. It offers bachelor degrees in nursing and in midwifery. It also awards MSc degrees in clinical psychology and critical care nursing.

Faculty of Science  
The faculty was established in 1980. It awards bachelor degrees in mathematics, biostatistics, chemistry, biochemistry, physics, biology, biotechnology, and environmental sciences. It also awards MSc degrees in the following majors: mathematics, physics, water resources management, zoology, microbiology, medical laboratory, and botany and mycology. The faculty also has a PhD program in theoretical and applied mathematics.

Faculty of Health Sciences  
Established in 2012, the Faculty consists of three departments: medical laboratory science, physiotherapy, and optometry department. These departments offer bachelor degrees in their respective specialties. The department of medical laboratory science also grants MCs degrees in medical laboratory sciences and in infection control. The molecular biology laboratory is one of very few local centers that offer genetic testing to the public.

Faculty of Finance and Administrative Sciences  
Founded in 1980, the faculty offers nine bachelor programs, including accounting, accounting (in English), business administration, business administration (in English), banking and finance, economics and applied statistics, and e-commerce. It awards Master of Arts degrees in two majors: accounting and finance, and business administration. The business administration program has the following concentrations: human resource management, marketing management, and financial management.

Faculty of Information Technology  
The Faculty of Information Technology (IT) was founded in the academic year 2004/2005. It consists of five departments: Computer Science, Information Technology, Software Development, Multimedia Technology and Web Development, and Mobile Computing and Smart Devices Applications. It awards Bachelor degrees in the five majors. It also awards Master of Science degrees in two majors: Data Science and Software Engineering.

Faculty of Medicine 
The faculty was inaugurated in 2006, and the first class graduated in 2012. Admission into the faculty is based on applicants' achievement scores in the high school national matriculation exam (Tawjihi). Study extends over six years, comprising three years of medical sciences and three in clinical training. Medical graduates are awarded a Doctor of Medicine (M.D.) degree. The faculty is listed in the World Directory of Medical Schools and the Foundation of International Medical Education Directory (FAIMER). It is also recognized by the UK General Medical Council (GMC). 

In addition to the M.D. program, the faculty grants post-graduate diplomas in Child Health and Nutrition for Physicians (DCHN), Anesthesia and Intensive Care, Emergency Medicine, Obstetrics and Reproductive Health, Vascular Surgery, in addition to a Masters of Science program in Disaster Management for Health Professionals which is a shared program with the Faculty of Health Sciences. 

The Faculty also is a recognized regional test center for the International Foundations of Medicine (IFOM) exams. In 2016, the Faculty of Medicine established The Hayat Center for Emergency and Crisis Management, which offers training courses in emergency medicine and crisis management to medical and health science students and healthcare staff from the different governmental and non-governmental institutions.

Rankings

Memberships and Affiliations 
IUG is a recognized member of twelve regional and international associations and networks of higher education: 

 Anna Lindh Euro-Mediterranean Foundation
 Association of Arab Universities (AAU)
 Community of Mediterranean Universities (CMU)
 Eurasian Universities Union (EURAS)
 Euro-Mediterranean Universities Consortium TETHYS
 Federation of the Universities of the Islamic World (FUIW)
 International Association of Universities (IAU)
 Mediterranean Universities Union (UNIMED)
 Peace Programme
 Réseau Méditerranéen des Ecoles d'Ingénieurs (RMEI)
 The Euro-Mediterranean University (EMUNI)
 Black Sea and Eastern Mediterranean Academic Network (BSEMAN)

The university has also developed partnerships with 142 higher education institutions around the world.

Donor institutions
The university has accepted donations from institutions such as the Arab Student Aid International, United Palestinian Appeal, Islamic Relief, the British Council, the World Bank, the Islamic Development Bank and Human Appeal International.

The university has accepted donations from the Middle East Children's Alliance for its rebuilding efforts.

February 2007 incident 
In February 2007, during the hight of fighting between Hamas and Fatah, the dominating party in the Palestine Liberation Organization (PLO), the Palestinian Authority (PA) Presidential Guards and Fatah militiamen stormed the Islamic University campus using mortars and rocket-propelled grenades, setting the library building and parts of the computer center and science building on fire.

Damage by Israeli air strikes
Just after midnight on 28/29 December 2008 local time, the university was bombed in six air strikes by the Israeli Air Force during the 2008 Gaza War. Palestinian academics claim that the attack destroyed 74 labs, including, Microbiology, Hematology, Genetics, Medical Technology and Medical Chemistry Labs, Physics Labs, Environmental and Earth Sciences Labs, Biology Labs, Biotechnology Labs, Optics Labs, Chemistry Labs, Engineering Labs, and Engineering and IT buildings.

An Israeli army spokeswoman told The Chronicle of Higher Education that university facilities were being used by Hamas to develop and store weapons including Qassam rockets used to target Israeli civilians. Hamas denied the Israeli allegation.  Human Rights Watch said that Israel's justification "did not address why a second strike demolished the women's quarters". The United Nations Fact Finding Mission on the Gaza Conflict examined the incident and disputed the Israeli claims, concluding that: "the mission also saw the destruction caused at the Islamic University and in other university buildings that were destroyed or damaged. These were civilian, educational buildings and the Mission did not find any information about their use as a military facility or their contribution to a military effort that might have made them a legitimate target in the eyes of the Israeli armed forces."

In its response to the strike, the university announced in a press release on January 21, 2009, that the university is an independent institution of higher education in Gaza and the largest among the Palestinian institutions that serve 20,000 students as an accredited member of several regional and international academic associations and organization. According to the press release, the attack destroyed the Science and Engineering buildings and damaged several others. The university called upon academics, local, regional and international higher educational and human rights institutions to speak out against the attacks. 

Several international academic institutions have proceeded to express their commitment to support IUG and other universities in Gaza. The International Association of Universities, of which IUG is a member, has claimed to have written to the university to express its deep concern over the effects of the war, and to be ready to mobilize its member universities in support of the rebuilding efforts of the university. Similarly, Prof. Espen Bjertness of  the University  of Oslo and member of the Steering Committee of PEACE, stressed that “the sad situation for all academics caused by the bombing of our member university, Islamic University, Gaza and of the Gaza Community Mental Health Program calls for appropriate action”.

The University was bombed again during the 2014 Israel–Gaza conflict, where on Saturday August 2, an Israeli airstrike targeted the administration building, causing severe damage to the building and to nearby buildings and the university's mosque. The Israeli army claimed it targeted a "weapon development" centre in the university, which the university denied. The bombing came a day after what became known as the "black Friday", one of the deadliest episodes of the war.

Relationship with Hamas
The Chronicle of Higher Education says that Islamic University was co-founded by one of the future founders of Hamas, Sheikh Ahmed Yassin, in 1978. The Washington Institute for Near East Policy wrote in a piece on USAID funding of organisations with possible links to terrorism that connections exist between the university and Hamas.

Arguing against such ties were Marcy Newman and Akram Habeeb, who wrote for the Middle East Children's Alliance in 2009: "equally important for our American colleagues is to remove the false label that IUG is a "Hamas-controlled" institution. Just as Palestinians in Gaza belong to a variety of political parties, IUG's students, board, faculty and staff represent that reality. IUG is a university like any other in the Palestinian Territories that reflects the diversity of its population."

Steven Erlanger, former Jerusalem bureau chief of the New York Times, described the IUG as "one of the prime means for Hamas to convert Palestinians to its Islamist cause," in a 2007 piece about Palestinian infighting and Israeli airstrikes on the Gaza Strip. This report was criticised by political economist Sara Roy of Harvard University, who explicitly stated that 'there can be no question that Hamas works within the framework of Islamic institutions in the Gaza Strip, and that there are certain direct links between Hamas and many of the social and economic institutions (in the strip). ... However, it is far more questionable whether an automatic and inevitable link exists between Hamas and Islamic social and economic institutions, whether those links are inherently subversive, or whether such institutions promote radicalism and violence as is commonly assumed." Roy also writes: "logic maintains, institutional clients become automatically linked to Hamas and constitute a base of support for political Islam. As a result, Islamic social institutions become recruiting centers for the Hamas's military wing. There is however, little hard evidence to support any of these allegations."

Gallery

See also
 List of Palestinian universities
 Education in the Palestinian territories

References

External links

 Official website
 Islamic University in photos
 General searching database for scholarships
 Publications of The Islamic University of Gaza (in Arabic)
 The Islamic University Conferences
 Report on connections between university and Hamas 

 
Educational institutions established in 1978
1978 establishments in the Israeli Military Governorate
Gaza City
Gaza
Nursing schools in the State of Palestine